Robert Swendsen (born 18 October 1929) is an Australian cricketer. He played in two first-class matches for Queensland in 1948/49.

See also
 List of Queensland first-class cricketers

References

External links
 

1929 births
Living people
Australian cricketers
Queensland cricketers
Cricketers from Queensland